William Spencer, 2nd Baron Spencer of Wormleighton (1591 – 19 December 1636) was an English nobleman, politician, and peer from the Spencer family.

Life 
Spencer was the second son of Robert Spencer, 1st Baron Spencer of Wormleighton, and his wife, Margaret Willoughby, and was baptised on 4 January 1591 at Brington, Northamptonshire. He matriculated at Magdalen College, Oxford with his elder brother John in October 1607. In the autumn of 1610 he traveled to France with his brother. On John's death at Blois in 1612, he became the heir to the barony. He became a Member of Parliament for Brackley in 1614, but left no trace in the records. As the member for Northamptonshire (1620–1622 & 1624–1627) he was an active participant in parliamentary sessions. From 6 May 1618 to 1621, Spencer held the office of Deputy Lieutenant of Northamptonshire. On 25 October 1627, he succeeded his father as 2nd Baron Spencer of Wormleighton.

Family 
Spencer married Lady Penelope Wriothesley, daughter of Henry Wriothesley, 3rd Earl of Southampton and Elizabeth Vernon in 1615. The couple had a number of children, including:

Henry Spencer, 1st Earl of Sunderland
Robert Spencer, 1st Viscount Teviot
William (1630-88) married Elizabeth Gerard, daughter of Dutton, lord Gerard of Gerard's Bromley.
Elizabeth married John Craven, 1st Baron Craven of Ryton
Anne married Sir Robert Townshend, gentleman of the privy chamber to [[Charles II]
Margaret married Anthony Ashley Cooper, 1st Earl of Shaftesbury
Alice, married Henry Moore, 1st Earl of Drogheda

He died on 19 December 1636, aged 44.

Ancestry

References 

1591 births
1636 deaths
Alumni of Magdalen College, Oxford
Barons in the Peerage of England
Deputy Lieutenants of Northamptonshire
William Spencer, 2nd Baron Spencer
English MPs 1614
English MPs 1621–1622
English MPs 1624–1625
English MPs 1625
English MPs 1626